Suraj Ka Satvan Ghoda is a 1992 Indian Hindi film directed by Shyam Benegal and based on the novel The Sun's Seventh Horse by Dharmavir Bharati. It won the 1993 National Film Award for Best Feature Film in Hindi. The self-reflexive film is also known for its subversive take on the "Devdas" syndrome. The film was produced by the National Film Development Corporation of India (NFDC). It stars Rajit Kapur, Rajeshwari Sachdev, Pallavi Joshi, Neena Gupta and Amrish Puri, among others.

Overview
The storyteller Manek Mulla (played by Rajit Kapur) tells his friends three stories of three women he had known at different points of time in his life: Rajeshwari Sachdev (a metaphor for the middle class), Pallavi Joshi (the intellectual and affluent), and Neena Gupta (the poor). The three stories are revealed to be three different strands of a single tale as seen from the points of view of the different lead characters in the film.

The lowest, slowest or the weakest in a group or society determines the speed or progress of the whole. The title of the film, a metaphor for the film itself, draws an analogy between society and the mythological iconography of the Sun's chariot drawn by seven horses.

The narrative style adds to the abstractness; the film is presented as a flashback of a contemporary artist, Shyam (played by Raghuvir Yadav). He remembers the many stories narrated by Mulla, a born raconteur during their gossip sessions with two of their mutual friends.

Cast
 Rajit Kapur as Manek Mulla; Story-teller
 K.K. Raina as Manek Mulla's brother
 Raghuvir Yadav as Narrator; Shyam, Manek Mulla's friend
 Amrish Puri as Mahesar Dalal
 Rajeshwari Sachdev as Jamuna
 Riju Bajaj as Tanna
 Anang Desai as Jamuna's father
 Mohini Sharma as Jamuna's mother
 Suresh Bhagwat as Jamuna's husband; zamindar
 Pallavi Joshi as Lalita; also known as Lily
 Ila Arun as Lily's mother
 Neena Gupta as Satti
 Lalit Mohan Tiwari as Chaman Thakur; Satti's adoptive uncle
 Virendra Saxena as Shopkeeper
 Himani Shivpuri as Roma Bibi, a distant relative of Jamuna
 Ravi Jhankal as Ramdhan

Music
"Yeh Shamen Sabki Shamen" - Udit Narayan, Kavita Krishnamurthy
"Yeh Shamen Sabki Shamen v2" - Udit Narayan, Kavita Krishnamurthy

References

External links
 

1992 films
1990s Hindi-language films
Films with screenplays by Shama Zaidi
Films directed by Shyam Benegal
Films based on Indian novels
Self-reflexive films
Films about women in India
Films scored by Vanraj Bhatia
Best Hindi Feature Film National Film Award winners
National Film Development Corporation of India films